The Qwaser of Stigmata is an anime series adapted from the manga of the same name written by Hiroyuki Yoshino and illustrated by Kenetsu Satō. Produced by Hoods Entertainment and directed by Hiraku Kaneko, the series was broadcast on the Mainichi Broadcasting System on January 10 to June 20, 2010, with a second season airing from April 12 to June 28, 2011.  The Qwaser of Stigmata hydroplanes across the common magical girl concept shown in series such as Sailor Moon and My-Hime while availing acts of sexual perversion and violence that includes torsos being forcibly torn asunder along with heavy use of fanservice that has led to the TV broadcast of  the episodes having been censored earlier. The raw uncensored "Director's Cut" version of the anime is available only by webcast or DVD/Blu-ray. The word master series is called "Quantum Meruit Quorum".

The first season adapts the first seven volumes of the manga over 20 episodes, with the last four episodes forming an original, self-contained story arc. Some episodes containing inappropriate previews have them replaced by a short recap episode in the TV version.

As of July 2010, four volumes have been released in Japan on DVD and Blu-ray by Victor Entertainment, based on director's cut version, but with reemed images and remixed audio along with new cuts. The first volume was released on April 21, 2010. The eight and last volume will be released on November 24, 2010. Each volume contains three episodes, as well as two pictures dramas per volume. The first series of them is  featuring the different female main character per volume. The second of them is  featuring Katja.

Sentai Filmworks licensed both seasons and the OVA for digital distribution and home video release in North America, releasing English subtitled DVD sets in 2012 and 2013. All episodes except for the OVA are available online in North America from the Anime Network streaming site.

Episode list

The Qwaser of Stigmata (TV)

The Qwaser of Stigmata: Portrait of the Empress (OVA)
This OVA episode was originally released in Japan on a DVD that was included with Volume 10 of the manga.

This OVA episode is included on the North American DVD release of The Qwaser of Stigmata II, as episode 10.5. The action for this side story takes place around the time period of the middle of the first season.

The Qwaser of Stigmata II (TV)

The OVA Portrait of The Empress is listed as episode 10.5 on the North American DVD release of Qwaser of Stigmata II but its plot takes place around the middle of the first season.

Theme songs

See also
List of The Qwaser of Stigmata characters

References

External links 
 The Qwaser of Stigmata (TV) List of episodes at Anime News Network
 
 The Qwaser of Stigmata II (TV) List of episodes at Anime News Network
 Show Info: The Qwaser of Stigmata (TV) episode at online streaming site Anime Network
 Show Info: The Qwaser of Stigmata II (TV) episode at online streaming site Anime Network
 List of episodes at Qwaser website 

Qwaser of Stigmata